is a railway station in Tenryū-ku, Hamamatsu,  Shizuoka Prefecture, Japan, operated by the third sector Tenryū Hamanako Railroad.

Lines
Tenryū-Futamata Station is served by the Tenryū Hamanako Line, and is located 26.2 kilometers from the starting point of the line at Kakegawa Station.

Station layout
The station has one side platform and one island platform serving three tracks. The station is staffed. The rail yard for the Tenryū Hamanako Line is located next to this station, and retains the roundhouse and turntable from the days the line used steam locomotives. Both are listed by that national government as Registered Tangible Cultural Properties under the category of “Heritage of Industrial Modernization”.

Adjacent stations

|-
!colspan=5|Tenryū Hamanako Railroad

Station History
Tenryū-Futamata Station was established on April 1, 1940 when the section of the Japan National Railways Futamata Line was extended from Enshū-Mori Station to Kanasashi Station. Scheduled freight services were discontinued from 1982. After the privatization of JNR on March 15, 1987, the station came under the control of the Tenryū Hamanako Line.

Passenger statistics
In fiscal 2016, the station was used by an average of 256 passengers daily (boarding passengers only).

Surrounding area
Locomotive Park
Hamamatsu City Tenryu Public Library

See also
 List of Railway Stations in Japan

References

External links

  Tenryū Hamanako Railroad Station information 
 

Railway stations in Shizuoka Prefecture
Railway stations in Japan opened in 1940
Stations of Tenryū Hamanako Railroad
Railway stations in Hamamatsu